Eleonora Rossi Drago, born Palmira Omiccioli, (23 September 1925 – 2 December 2007) was an Italian film actress. She was born in Quinto al Mare, Genoa, Italy, and had the leading role in Le amiche. She appeared in Un maledetto imbroglio. In 1960, for her performance in Estate violenta, she won the best actress prize of the Mar del Plata Film Festival and the Nastro d'argento.  In 1964, she appeared in La Cittadella. She died in Palermo, Italy.

Selected filmography 

 The Pirates of Capri (1949) - Annette
 Altura (1949) - Grazia
 Due sorelle amano (1950) - Marilù, Maria Pia's sister
 Behind Closed Shutters (1951) - Sandra
 Verginità (1951) - Mara Sibilia
 The Last Sentence (1951) - Marisa
 Barefoot Savage (1952) - Franca Gabrie
 Girls Marked Danger (1952) - Alda
 The Flame (1952) - Monica
 Three Forbidden Stories (1952) - Gianna Aragona (Third segment)
 I sette dell'Orsa maggiore (1953) - Marion
 The Slave (1953) - Elena Landa
 Daughters of Destiny (1954) - Angela Ascari / Farmgirl (segment "Elisabeth")
 Vestire gli ignudi (1954) - Ersilia Drei
 On Trial (L'affaire Maurizius) (1954) - Anna Jahn
 Le Amiche (1955) - Clelia
 A Woman Alone (1956) - Luisa
 The Awakening (1956) - Assunta - madre di Salvatore
 Il prezzo della gloria (1956) - Anna
 Kean: Genius or Scoundrel (1957) - Contessa Elena Koefeld
 Anyone Can Kill Me (1957) - Odette - la femme du directeur
 La Tour, prends garde ! (1958) - La comtesse Malvina d'Amalfi
 The Road a Year Long (1958) - Susanna
 Winter Holidays (1959) - La comtesse Paola Parioli
 The Employee (1959) - Marina
 Dagli Appennini alle Ande (1959) - Marco's mother
 The Facts of Murder (1959) - L'Assassinata
 Estate Violenta (1959) - Roberta Parmesan
 The Employee (1960) - Maria Jacobetti
 David and Goliath (1960) - Merab
 Under Ten Flags (1960) - Elsa
 La garçonnière (1960) - Giulia Fiorini
 The Red Hand (1960) - Violetta Scotoni
 Final Accord (1960) - Linda Valore
 Sword of the Conqueror (1961) - Rosmunda
 Pigeon Shoot (1961) - Anna
 Caccia all'uomo (1961) - Clara Ducci
 Love at Twenty (1962) - Valentina
 The Carpet of Horror (1962) - Mabel Hughes
 Anima nera (1962) - Alessandra
 le tueur a la Rose Rouge (1962)
 Hypnosis (1962) - Magda Berger
 I Don Giovanni della Costa Azzurra (1962) - Jasmine
 Storm Over Ceylon (1963) - Maharani from Tungala
 Wounds of Hunger (1963) - The Widow
 Il treno del sabato (1964) - Rosy Pallante
 La Cittadella (1964, TV Mini-Series) - Francis Lawrence
 Let's Talk About Women (1964) - Indolent Lady
 Amore facile (1964) - Lisa Bollati (segment "Il vedovo bianco")
 Love and Marriage (1964) - (segment "Ultima carta, L'")
 Il disco volante (1964) - Clelia
 El Diablo también llora (1965) - Ana Sandoval
 I Kill, You Kill (1965) - Vera (segment "Il Plenilunio")
 Uncle Tom's Cabin (1965) - Mrs. Saint-Claire
 Su e giù (1965) - Violante Persici (segment " Il Colpo Del Leone")
 Assassination in Rome (1965) - Erika Tiller
 The Bible: In the Beginning... (1966) - Lot's Wife
 Mano di velluto (1966)
 El último sábado (1967)
 Love Problems (1968) - Countess
 Camille 2000 (1969) - Prudence
 Gli angeli del 2000 (1969) - Dory
 Dorian Gray (1970) - Esther Clouston
 In the Folds of the Flesh (1970) - Lucille / housekeeper (final film role)

References

External links
 
 

Italian film actresses
20th-century Italian actresses
1925 births
2007 deaths
Actors from Genoa
Nastro d'Argento winners